The Ludger-Duvernay Prize is a Quebec award created in 1944 and named in honour of journalist Ludger Duvernay. It is awarded by the Saint-Jean-Baptiste Society of Montreal to recognize the merits of a person whose competence and influence in the literary field serve the best interests of Quebec. A laureate must be a native of Quebec and considered professional in the world of letters. The prize had been awarded every three years since 1991; it has not been awarded since 2015.

Prize winners 

 1944 - Guy Frégault
 1945 - Germaine Guèvremont
 1946 - Robert Charbonneau
 1947 - Esdras Minville
 1948 - Félix-Antoine Savard
 1949 - Jean Bruchési
 1950 - Alain Grandbois
 1951 - Léo-Paul Desrosiers
 1952 - Lionel Groulx
 1953 - Robert de Rocquebrune
 1954 - Robert Choquette
 1955 - Philippe Panneton
 1956 - Gabrielle Roy
 1957 - Rina Lasnier
 1958 - Anne Hébert
 1959 - Victor Barbeau

 1960 - Gérard Morisset
 1961 - François-Albert Angers
 1962 - Roger Duhamel
 1963 - Jean Simard
 1964 - Alfred Desrochers
 1966 - Marcel Trudel
 1967 - Robert Rumilly
 1968 - Pierre Perrault
 1969 - Luc Lacourcière
 1970 - Michel Brunet
 1971 - Pierre Vadeboncœur
 1972 - Jacques Ferron
 1973 - Jacques Godbout
 1974 - Marcel Rioux
 1975 - Robert-Lionel Séguin
 1976 - Jacques Brossard
 1977 - Gaston Miron
 1978 - Jacques Brault

 1979 - Michèle Lalonde
 1980 - Claude Jasmin
 1981 - Victor-Lévy Beaulieu
 1982 - Jean Éthier-Blais
 1984 - Louis Caron
 1987 - Gérald Godin
 1989 - Marie-Claire Blais
 1990 - Jacques Folch-Ribas
 1991 - Pierre Morency
 1994 - Fernand Ouellette
 1997 - Marie Laberge
 2011 - Yves Beauchemin
 2013 - Francine Ouellette
 2015 - Dany Laferrière

References

External links
Prize winners on la Société Saint-Jean-Baptiste de Montréal 

1944 establishments in Quebec
Awards established in 1944
Culture of Quebec
Quebec awards
Quebec-related lists